Matt Kaeberlein (born 1971) is an American biologist and biogerontologist best known for his research on evolutionarily conserved mechanisms of aging.  He is currently a professor of pathology at the University of Washington in Seattle.

Education
Kaeberlin attended Western Washington University as an undergraduate and received a B.S. in biochemistry and a B.A. in mathematics in 1997. He received his Ph.D. in biology from MIT in 2002, advised by Leonard Guarente, and did his post-doctoral work with Stanley Fields in the Department of Genome Sciences at the University of Washington.

Academic career
Kaeberlein became an assistant professor at UW in 2006, an associate professor in 2011, and a full professor in 2015. He has received several awards for his work, including a Breakthroughs in Gerontology Award, an Alzheimer's Association New Investigator Award, and an Ellison Medical Foundation New Scholar in Aging Award. In 2011, he was named the Vincent Cristofalo Rising Star in Aging Research by the American Federation for Aging Research and appointed as a GSA Fellow. Kaeberlein was also recognized as an Undergraduate Research Mentor of the Year in 2010.

Kaeberlein is a distinguished visiting professor of biochemistry at the Aging Research Institute of Guangdong Medical College in Dongguan, China. He is also the co-director of the University of Washington Nathan Shock Center of Excellence in the Basic Biology of Aging, the director of SAGEWEB, and the founding director of the Healthy Aging and Longevity Research Institute at the University of Washington. He is also a co-director of the Dog Aging Project.

Kaeberlein has expressed the view that current advances in aging research could enable most people to potentially live to 100 or even 120 in good health.

Honors and awards
2017                   Elected Fellow of the American Association for the Advancement of Science
2017			Elected Chair of the Biological Sciences Section of the Gerontological Society of America
2015			Elected President of the American Aging Association
2011			Selected as a Gerontological Society of America Fellow
2010			Vincent Cristofalo Rising Star in Aging Research Award
2010			Appointed co-director of the University of Washington Nathan Shock Center of Excellence in the Basic Biology of Aging
2009			Appointed distinguished visiting professor, Institute for Aging Research, Guangdong Medical College, Dongguan, China
2009			University of Washington Young Investigator Science in Medicine Lecture
2009			University of Washington Undergraduate Research Mentor Award
2008			New Scholar in Aging Award, The Ellison Medical Foundation
2008			Alzheimer's Association New Investigator Award
2007			Breakthroughs in Gerontology Award, American Federation for Aging Research and the Glenn Foundation
2006			American Federation for Aging Research Junior Faculty Research Award

Professional Societies 
American Aging Association
Gerontological Society of America

References

External links 
 Kaeberlein Lab Website
 Kaeberlein’s Faculty Page at University of Washington
 SAGEWEB Website
University of Washington Nathan Shock Center Website

21st-century American biologists
Living people
1971 births